Naumkin is a Russian masculine surname, its feminine counterpart is Naumkina. It may refer to
Dmitri Naumkin (born 1976), Russian ice dancer 
Vitaly Naumkin (born 1945), Russian academic 
Yuriy Naumkin (born 1968), Russian long jumper 

Russian-language surnames